A fairlead is a device to guide a line, rope or cable around an object, out of the way or to stop it from moving laterally. Typically a fairlead will be a ring or hook. 

The fairlead may be a separate piece of hardware, or it could be a hole in the structure. There are two types of fairlead: roller and fixed. In a roller fairlead, there are four rollers in total. The first two are vertically mounted and the other two are horizontally mounted. A fixed fairlead is one piece of smooth, rounded metal with no moving parts. A fixed fairlead may be open or closed. Compared to a roller fairlead, a fixed fairlead is extremely simple.

A fairlead can also be used to stop a straight run of line from vibrating or rubbing on another surface. An additional use on boats is to keep a loose end of line from sliding around the deck (e.g. the windward (inactive) jib sheet).

If the line is meant to be moved while in the fairlead, the angle in the line created by the fairlead must be shallow to minimize friction. For larger angles a block or pulley is used as a fairlead to reduce friction. Where the line is removed from a hook fairlead before using, the angle is not an issue.

While fairleads are most frequently found in nautical applications, they can be found anywhere rigging is used. In off-roading, a fairlead is used to guide the winch cable and remove lateral strain from the winch. A roller fairlead is used with steel cable and a hawse fairlead is used with synthetic cable.

Fairleads are used on almost every sailboat. Even as simple a sailboat as a Sunfish has a fairlead for each of its two lines. A ring fairlead holds the halyard parallel to the mast so its cleat can be located near to the cockpit. On models without a deck block for the sheet, a hook fairlead in the forward edge of the cockpit gives the sailor options when handling the sheet.

An example of hook fairlead can be seen on buildings with an angled flagstaff mounted over a door.  At the base of the flagstaff is usually a hook so the flag halyard can be held parallel to the pole, and still tied off to a cleat beside the door, rather than above.

References

Sailing rigs and rigging

es:Gatera (náutica)
fr:Chaumard (accastillage)
sv:Halkip